The Balboa 27 8.2 is an American trailerable sailboat that was designed by Lyle C. Hess as a cruiser and first built in 1976.

The Balboa 27 8.2 is a development of the Balboa 26.

Production
The design was built by Coastal Recreation in the United States, starting in 1976, but it is now out of production.

Design
The Balboa 27 8.2 is a recreational keelboat, built predominantly of fiberglass, with wood trim. It has a masthead sloop rig, a raked stem, a plumb transom, a transom-hung rudder controlled by a tiller and a retractable swing keel. It displaces  and carries  of ballast.

The boat is fitted with a  British Petters Limited diesel engine or a small outboard motor for docking and maneuvering.

Operational history
In a 1977 article Chuck Malseed described the boat as, "a comfortable 27' trailerable."

See also
List of sailing boat types

References

External links
Photo of a Balboa 27 8.2
Balboa 27 video tour

Keelboats
1970s sailboat type designs
Sailing yachts
Trailer sailers
Sailboat type designs by Lyle Hess
Sailboat types built by Coastal Recreation, Inc